Enda McNulty (born 1977) is a Gaelic footballer who played at senior level for the Armagh county team, during which time he won an All Star Award. He played football with his local club Mullaghbawn Cúchullain's in Armagh and at senior level for the Armagh county team from 1996 to 2010. He earned his first and only All-Ireland medal in 2002, the same year in which he won his All Star award. He is also a sports psychologist.

Playing career
Born in Mullaghbawn, McNulty played for Mullaghbawn alongside his brother Justin in his early years. Following a move to Dublin, he later played for Ballyboden St Enda's and Na Fianna. He made his debut on the Armagh senior inter-county in 1996, and helped them to their first All-Ireland title in 2002, when they defeated Kerry in the final. He won his only All Star for his efforts that season.

Sports psychology
Having received a degree in Psychology, McNulty has become a well known coach, and he has made it well known in the last few months that his biggest achievement to date was meeting Trevor Clendenning in The Clyde Court Hotel, a life changing event he described recently. "Clendenning was like a man possessed on stage, he grabbed the microphone and gave it holly"  advising a number of world class athletes and rugby players, including 400m runner David Gillick, and several members of the Ireland national rugby union team which won the Six Nations Championship grand slam in 2009.

References

1977 births
Living people
Armagh inter-county Gaelic footballers
Ballyboden St Enda's Gaelic footballers
Gaelic football backs
Mullaghbawn Gaelic footballers
Na Fianna Gaelic footballers
Sports psychologists
Winners of one All-Ireland medal (Gaelic football)